An antigen-presenting cell vaccine, or an APC vaccine, is a vaccine made of antigens and antigen-presenting cells (APCs). 

, the only APC vaccine approved by the American Food and Drug Administration is for prostatic acid phosphatase, a commonly over-expressed prostate cancer antigen.

References

External links
 Antigen-presenting cell vaccine entry in the public domain NCI Dictionary of Cancer Terms

Vaccines